George Henry Hopkins (11 May 1901 – 1974) was an English footballer who played in the Football League for Notts County and Rotherham County.

References

1901 births
1974 deaths
English footballers
Association football goalkeepers
English Football League players
Wombwell F.C. players
Rotherham County F.C. players
Newark Town F.C. players
Notts County F.C. players
Scarborough F.C. players
Oldham Athletic A.F.C. players
Ashton United F.C. players
Stockport County F.C. players